Patrulha Aérea Civil (PAC) - "Civil Air Patrol" in Portuguese, is a nonprofit corporation, congressionally chartered by the (1213/1959) law, supported by the federal government, serving as a civilian auxiliary of the Brazilian Air Force.

History
The "Patrulha Aérea Civil" was conceived in the late 1950s with strong influence from the "Civil Air Patrol" which has existed in the United States since the 1930s and officially created in December 1941.

Brazilian Air Force officials who visited CAP-USA ("Civil Air Patrol") envisioned the usefulness of a similar organization in Brazil, filling a gap in search and rescue. At the time, they received support from politicians, the press, the military, airmen and journalists.

"PAC-BRASIL" was created under the authorization of the Ministry of Aeronautics at the time Francisco de Assis Correia de Melo and having as its founders the Air Force Officers Brig. Gen. Alfredo Gonçalves Correia "in memorian", and Lt. Col. Antônio da Costa Faria "in memorian", members of the "Department of Civil Aviation" (DAC), in the then capital of the "Republic of the United States of Brazil", Rio de Janeiro.

Important missions were assigned to "PAC-BRASIL", such as developing and supporting flying clubs in the country, supporting Santos Dumond Foundation, supporting the creation of Aeronautics Museum (today Museu Aeroespacial), and disseminate aeronautical knowledge, search and rescue missions, air patrolling, among many others.

In a few months, "PAC-BRASIL" had a queue for enlisting volunteers throughout Brazil. In the 1960s, the PAC had a body of 100,000 members nationwide.

See also
 Civil Air Patrol
 National security
 Civil defense
 Royal Canadian Air Cadets

References

External links
  (.org)
  (.com)
 Processo Seletivo para ingressar na Patrulha Aérea Civil Maricá
 Patrulha Aérea Civil pede ajuda para seguir com atendimento ao público
 Tragédia Muzema: resgatista da Patrulha Aérea Civil explica que trabalho de socorro é delicado

Organisations based in Brazil
Military education and training
Brazilian Air Force
Organizations established in 1959
Humanitarian aid